Brock Mueller (born 23 May 1978 in Belmont, New South Wales, Australia) is an Australian former professional rugby league footballer. He played for the Newcastle Knights from 1998 to 1999. His position of preference was in the Back Row.

Playing career
Between 1998 and 1999 Mueller was at the Newcastle Knights, coming off the bench in six matches and scoring one try.

Mueller then moved to France and played for the Villeneuve Leopards in 2001 and 2002.

Personal life
His brother Blake played for the Newcastle Knights between 2003 and 2005.

References

1978 births
Living people
Australian rugby league players
Newcastle Knights players
Rugby league players from Newcastle, New South Wales
Rugby league second-rows
Villeneuve Leopards players